NORML UK is the United Kingdom branch of the National Organization for the Reform of Marijuana Laws, a cannabis legalisation campaign organisation. NORML UK was founded in 2012. Their mission statement is "NORML UK demands the right to pursue peaceful activities with cannabis without unnecessary intervention from the authorities." Similar affiliated organisations operate under the NORML banner in other countries like South Africa, New Zealand and France.

See also
 Cannabis in the United Kingdom
 Cannabis Law Reform
 Drug policy reform
 Release
 Transform Drug Policy Foundation

References

External links

 NORML UK

Cannabis law reform organizations
Drug policy organizations
Organizations established in 2012
Cannabis in the United Kingdom
2012 in cannabis
2012 establishments in the United Kingdom
National Organization for the Reform of Marijuana Laws
Drug policy of the United Kingdom